These are the Irish Recorded Music Association's number one albums of 2004, per the Top 100 Individual Artist Albums chart.

See also
2004 in music
List of number-one albums (Ireland)

External links
Current Irish Albums Chart – Top 100 Positions

2004 in Irish music
2004